Hysterostegiella is a genus of fungi in the family Dermateaceae. The genus contains 10 species.

Species 

Hysterostegiella crassomarginata
Hysterostegiella dowardensis
Hysterostegiella dumeti
Hysterostegiella fenestrata
Hysterostegiella hydrophila
Hysterostegiella juniperina
Hysterostegiella lapponica
Hysterostegiella lauri
Hysterostegiella quercea
Hysterostegiella typhae
Hysterostegiella valvata
Hysterostegiella zelendarkensis

See also 

 List of Dermateaceae genera

References

External links 

 Hysterostegiella at Index Fungorum

Dermateaceae genera
Taxa named by Franz Xaver Rudolf von Höhnel